Esa Puolakka (born 7 December 1958) is a Finnish speed skater. He competed in two events at the 1980 Winter Olympics.

References

External links
 

1958 births
Living people
Finnish male speed skaters
Olympic speed skaters of Finland
Speed skaters at the 1980 Winter Olympics
People from Pieksämäki
Sportspeople from South Savo